William ("Willy") Vanhuylenbroek (born 21 June 1956) is a long-distance runner from Belgium, who won the 1986 edition of Amsterdam Marathon, clocking 2:14:46 on 11 May 1986.  He had finished second the year before.  He finished in 16th place at the 1990 European Championships in Split.  He represented his national team at the 1981, 1986, 1987 and 1989 IAAF World Cross Country Championships.

Achievements

References

 1986 Year Ranking

1956 births
Living people
Belgian male long-distance runners
Place of birth missing (living people)